The Gene Kelly Awards for Excellence in High School Musical Theater, named after the actor/director Gene Kelly, are given out yearly by the Pittsburgh Civic Light Opera and the University of Pittsburgh.  The award was founded in 1991 and celebrates excellence in the musicals of the Pittsburgh area's high schools. For Best Musical, there are three levels based on budget. The organization also offers scholarships to high school seniors involved in any aspect of the show. As of 2011, there are 29 participating schools. In 2009, the Gene Kelly Awards spawned the National High School Musical Theater Awards, nicknamed "The Jimmys", which the Pittsburgh Civic Light Opera co-produces with Nederlander Presentations.  The Awards were cancelled in 2020 due to the COVID-19 pandemic. The Awards in 2021 were limited to individual awards only.

Categories
Best Scenic Design (three budget levels)
Best Costume Design (three budget levels)
Best Lighting Design (three budget levels)
Best All-Student Orchestra
Best Execution of Choreography
Best Crew/Technical Execution
Best Ensemble
Best Execution of Direction
Best Execution of Music Direction
Best Supporting Actor
Best Supporting Actress
Best Actor
Best Actress
Best Musical (three budget levels)

Participating schools 
Avonworth High School
Baldwin High School
Bishop Canevin High School
Central Catholic High School
Chartiers Valley High School
Elizabeth Forward High School
Hampton High School
Keystone Oaks High School
McKeesport Area High School
Montour High School
Moon Area High School
North Hills High School
Our Lady of the Sacred Heart High School
Penn Hills High School
Pine-Richland High School
Pittsburgh Allderdice
Pittsburgh CAPA
Plum High School
Quaker Valley High School 
Redeemer Lutheran School
Riverview High School
Serra Catholic High School 
Sewickley Academy 
South Fayette High School
Springdale High School
Thomas Jefferson High School
West Allegheny High School
Westinghouse Arts Academy Charter School
Woodland Hills High School

Former participants
Brashear High School
Bethel Park High School
Brentwood High School
Carlynton High School
Deer Lakes High School
East Allegheny High School
Fox Chapel Area High School
North Allegheny High School
North Catholic High School
Northgate Junior – Senior High School 
Peabody High School
Perry Traditional Academy 
Propel Braddock Hills
Robinson Township Christian School
Schenley High School
Seton-La Salle High School
Shady Side Academy 
Shaler Area High School
South Park High School
South Allegheny High School
St. Joseph High School
Steel Valley High School
Upper St. Clair High School
Vincentian Academy
West Mifflin Area High School
Winchester Thurston School

Nominees and winners

2022 nominees and winners

2021 nominees and winners

2019 nominees and winners

2018 nominees and winners

2017 nominees and winners

2016 nominees and winners

2015 nominees and winners

2014 nominees and winners

2013 nominees and winners

2012 nominees and winners

2011 nominees and winners

2010 nominees and winners

2009 nominees and winners

2008 nominees and winners

2007 nominees and winners
The award winners from each category are bolded.

2006 nominees and winners
The award winners from each category are bolded.

2005 nominees and winners

2004 nominees and winners

2003 nominees and winners

2002 nominees and winners

2001 nominees and winners

2000 nominees and winners

1999 nominees and winners

1998 nominees and winners

1997 nominees and winners

1996 nominees and winners

1995 nominees and winners

1994 nominees and winners

1993 nominees and winners

1992 nominees and winners

1991 nominees and winners

References

External links
Gene Kelly Awards homepage
Pittsburgh CLO homepage
University of Pittsburgh Theatre Arts
WPXI TV 11 High School Shows

University of Pittsburgh